Cell growth regulator with EF-hand domain 1 is a protein that in humans is encoded by the CGREF1 gene.

References

Further reading